Bernard Jean Marcel Fauqueux (2 September 1938 – 1 June 1989) was a French gymnast. He competed at the 1960 Summer Olympics and the 1964 Summer Olympics.

References

External links
 

1938 births
1989 deaths
French male artistic gymnasts
Olympic gymnasts of France
Gymnasts at the 1960 Summer Olympics
Gymnasts at the 1964 Summer Olympics
People from Vernon, Eure
Sportspeople from Eure
20th-century French people